National Highway 351F, commonly referred to as NH 351F is a national highway in India. It is a secondary route of National Highway 51.  NH-351F runs in the state of Gujarat in India.

Route 
NH351F connects Amreli Chowk, Ishvariya, Varasda, Pipariya, Toda, Lathy, Mahavirnagar, Chavand and Dhasa Chowk in the state of Gujarat.

Junctions  
 
  Terminal near Amreli.
  Terminal near Dhasa Chowk.

See also 
 List of National Highways in India
 List of National Highways in India by state

References

External links 

 NH 351F on OpenStreetMap

National highways in India
National Highways in Gujarat